{{Infobox song
| name       = Find a Way
| cover      =
| alt        =
| type       = single
| artist     = Alessandra Amoroso
| album      = Scialla
| released   = 
| recorded   = 2009
| studio     =
| venue      =
| genre      = Pop
| length     = 03:28
| label      = Sony BMG
| writer     = A Argyle, I Osmand
| producer   =
| chronology = Alessandra Amoroso
| prev_title =
| prev_year  =
| next_title = Immobile''
| next_year  = 2009
}}
"Find a Way'''" is the first single from Alessandra Amoroso. Find a Way" is the only English-language song from Amoroso.

Track listing
Digital download/Standard
"Find a Way" – 03:28

Charts

References

External links
 Find A Way Live @ Amici

Alessandra Amoroso songs
2009 singles
Pop ballads
2009 songs
Sony BMG singles
Songs written by Adam Argyle